Microeurydemus is a genus of leaf beetles in the subfamily Eumolpinae. It is known from Africa and the Arabian Peninsula.

Species
 Microeurydemus africanus (Jacoby, 1900)
 Microeurydemus airensis (Pic, 1950)
 Microeurydemus flavescens (Bryant, 1942)
 Microeurydemus ongemepres Pic, 
 Microeurydemus semivittatus (Jacoby, 1899)
 Microeurydemus unimaculatus Pic, 1938
 Microeurydemus wraniki Lopatin in Lopatin & Konstantinov, 1994

Species moved to Microsyagrus:
 Microeurydemus bingeri Pic, 1949
 Microeurydemus gabonicus Pic, 1949
 Microeurydemus immaculatus Pic, 1949

Species moved to Pathius:
 Microeurydemus pallidus Pic, 1952: renamed to Pathius pici Zoia, 2019

Species moved to Phascus:
 Microeurydemus instriatus Pic, 1949

References

Eumolpinae
Chrysomelidae genera
Taxa named by Maurice Pic
Beetles of Africa
Beetles of Asia